The canton of Fruges is a canton situated in the Pas-de-Calais département and in the Hauts-de-France region of France.

Geography 
An area of small valleys and plateaux, consisting mostly of farmland, with the town of Fruges at its centre.

Composition 
At the French canton reorganisation which came into effect in March 2015, the canton was expanded from 25 to 55 communes (6 of which merged into the new communes Saint-Augustin, Bellinghem and Enquin-lez-Guinegatte):

Ambricourt
Audincthun
Avondance
Avroult
Beaumetz-lès-Aire
Bellinghem
Bomy
Canlers
Coupelle-Neuve
Coupelle-Vieille
Coyecques
Crépy
Créquy
Delettes
Dennebrœucq
Ecques
Embry
Enquin-lez-Guinegatte
Erny-Saint-Julien
Fauquembergues
Febvin-Palfart
Fléchin
Fressin
Fruges
Heuringhem
Hézecques
Laires
Lebiez
Lugy
Mametz
Matringhem
Mencas
Merck-Saint-Liévin
Planques
Quiestède
Racquinghem
Radinghem
Reclinghem
Renty
Rimboval
Royon
Ruisseauville
Sains-lès-Fressin
Saint-Augustin
Saint-Martin-d'Hardinghem
Senlis
Thérouanne
Thiembronne
Torcy
Verchin
Vincly 
Wardrecques

Population

See also 
 Arrondissements of the Pas-de-Calais department
 Cantons of Pas-de-Calais
 Communes of Pas-de-Calais

References

Fruges